State Route 571 (SR 571) is an east–west state highway in west-central Ohio, part of a statewide road transportation system.  It indirectly connects the cities of Union City and Greenville with Springfield via a final  on U.S. Route 40.

Route description

State Route 571 starts in the Indiana/Ohio border town of Union City. To the west, it turns into Indiana State Route 28, which goes west toward Albany and Alexandria, Indiana. To the east, SR 571 goes southeast through Hill Grove and Coletown, and then parallels Greenville Creek into Greenville. From Greenville it continues southeast through Painter Creek and Laura to West Milton where it turns due east, passes over Interstate 75 to Tipp City and New Carlisle.

Although no longer a state route, the road keeps on going across US 40 as County Highway 303 (Medway-Carlisle Road) in Clark County. The road continues south, through the village of Medway and further on it turns into the northern terminus of I-675 at I-70.

The portion of SR 571 between Union City and Greenville in Darke County is designated the "196th Light Infantry Brigade SP4 Robert L. Fowble Jr., and PFC Jack E. Beam Memorial Highway", in honor of two U.S. Army soldiers from the same brigade who were killed by enemy fire while fighting in the Vietnam War. Fowble, a Greenville native, died on November 23, 1966. Beam, a Union City native, died on Dec. 21, 1966.

The portion of the route within Miami County is designated the "Robert E. Netzley Highway" in honor of the late former state representative.

History
The Union City-to-Springfield roads have been part of the Ohio state highway system since 1912. Before 1923, numerous highway numbers comprised the current route of SR 571. In 1923, the route between Greenville and then-SR 1 (now US 40); the remainder of the route between Union City and Greenville was the westernmost segment of SR 29. By 1932, SR 29 was truncated to Urbana with US 36 taking over its former route between Greenville and Urbana; SR 71 was also extended from Greenville to the Indiana state line in Union City. By 1939, the entire length of SR 71 had been paved.

Following the extension to Union City, no major changes to the routing of SR 71 and SR 571 have been made. The only change to the highway came in 1962 when Ohio renumbered state highways that shared route numbers with proposed Interstates. Because of I-71, SR 71 was renumbered to SR 571.

An unrelated SR 571 was in existence from 1937 to 1957 in Bridgewater Township, Williams County. This SR 571 ran from US 20 to the Michigan state line. In 1957, SR 576 was extended north and took over the  highway.

Major intersections

References

External links

571
Transportation in Darke County, Ohio
Transportation in Miami County, Ohio
Transportation in Clark County, Ohio